The 24th Academy of Country Music Awards ceremony was held on April 10, 1989, at Disney Studios, Burbank, California. it was hosted by Patrick Duffy, K.T. Oslin, and George Strait.

Winners and nominees 
Winners are shown in bold.

References 

Music awards